Christopher Eubanks and Kevin King were the defending champions but chose not to defend their title.

Nathaniel Lammons and Jackson Withrow won the title after defeating Treat Huey and Max Schnur 6–4, 3–6, [10–6] in  the final.

Seeds

Draw

References

External links
 Main draw

JSM Challenger of Champaign–Urbana - Doubles
2021 Doubles